Vårnatt (Spring Night) is a Norwegian film from 1976 directed by Erik Solbakken. Solbakken also wrote the script, which was based on Tarjei Vesaas's 1954 novel Spring Night. Olav Dalgard was the script consultant.

Vårnatt premiered on February 26, 1976.

Plot
Hallstein and Sissel live together with their parents in a small village. One spring night they will be left alone at home for the first time while their parents are at a funeral in another village. There is a warm familiarity between them and they are looking forward to being at home. However, when they are about to eat supper, there is a knock on the door. A foreign family in need of help is standing outside. Their car has broken down, and a young woman with them is ready to give birth. They need room, beds, and a midwife. Eventually the unresolved conflicts between them lead to tension in the little house.

Cast 
Espen Skjønberg as Hjalmar
Astrid Folstad as Kristine
Svein Scharffenberg as Karl
Bentein Baardson as Tore
Anders Mordal as Hallstein
Inger Marie Andersen as the mother
Bente Børsum as a night-shift nurse
Wilfred Breistrand as the father
Maryon Eilertsen as Sissel
Veslemøy Haslund as a midwife
Tania Kjeldset as Gudrun
Kirsti Kolstad as Grete
Arne Lie as an orderly
Svein Moen as an orderly
Kjell Stormoen as a doctor

References

External links 
 
 Nasjonalbiblioteket: Norsk filmografi: Vårnatt.

Norwegian drama films
1970s Norwegian-language films
1976 films
Films based on Norwegian novels
Films based on works by Tarjei Vesaas
1976 drama films